The Dublin Airport drone incidents are a number of incursions of drones into airspace around Dublin Airport, including a series in early 2023, which caused disruption of airport operations. It is illegal to fly a UAV within  of an airport in Ireland.

2022

27 March
Airport operations were suspended for around 20 minutes in the afternoon due to a UAV being flown near the airport.

2023

24 January
Flight operations were disrupted for half an hour in the evening, leading to two flights being diverted to other airports.

Early February
On 3 February four flights were diverted as a result of a drone being reported near the airport. Dublin Airport Authority investigated and found there had been no drone there that day.

On 4 February flights were disrupted for about 45 minutes from 2:10pm after two confirmed drone sightings.

On 6 February a 40-minute interruption was caused when a drone was sighted around 7pm, causing disruption to flights until 7:45pm.

21 February
Airport operations were suspended for around 30 minutes, until 20:50, due to a UAV being flown near the airport.

2 March
Airport operations were once again suspended for around 30 minutes, due to a drone being flown near the airport

Prosecution
On 10 February a 50-year-old man was charged under the Air Navigation and Transport Act with unlawfully and intentionally interfering with airport operations by flying a UAV on the Naul Road in Cloughran, in the 300 metre critical area which was likely to interfere with aircraft operation. The offence carries a penalty of up to life imprisonment, and the legislation does not allow for a suspended sentence or probation. He made no reply to the charge. He was released on bail with conditions including that he doesn't fly drones in the Irish state, that he signs on weekly at his Garda station and that he surrenders his passport. He is scheduled to appear before the court on 14 April.

Reactions
On 7 February, Minister Eamon Ryan and Minister of State Jack Chambers met with Gardaí and representatives of the regulator, the Irish Aviation Authority, and the airport operator, the Dublin Airport Authority, to discuss the disruptions. Ryan said that the government is supporting Dublin Airport and is looking into methods to deter drones. Ryanair called for the government to take immediate action as four aircraft belonging to the company could not land on 6 February.

References

Aviation accidents and incidents in Ireland
2022 in Ireland
2023 in Ireland
Dublin Airport